The 2011–12 Southeastern Conference men's basketball season began with practices on October 15, 2011 and ended with the SEC Tournament on March 8–11, 2012 at the New Orleans Arena in New Orleans.

This was the first season for the SEC's one-division alignment in men's basketball. The league's head coaches voted at the league's annual meeting on June 1, 2011 to eliminate the divisional format, starting with the 2011–12 season.

Pre-season polls and teams
Pre-Season Poll:

Pre-Season All-SEC Teams

SEC Coaches select 8 players
Players in bold are choices for SEC Player of the Year

Rankings

Conference schedules

Composite matrix
This table summarizes the head-to-head results between teams in conference play. (x) indicates games remaining this season.

Postseason

SEC tournament

NCAA tournament

National Invitation Tournament

Other tournaments

2012 NBA draft

The following 1st & 2nd team All-SEC performers were listed as seniors: Dee Bost, Jeffery Taylor, JaMychal Green, Erving Walker, Terrance Henry. The deadline for entering the NBA draft is April 29, but once one has declared, the deadline for withdrawing the declaration and retaining NCAA eligibility is April 10. The deadline for submitting information to the NBA Advisory Committee for a 72-hour response is April 3.

The following SEC underclassmen have sought the advice of the NBA's undergraduate advisory committee to determine his draft prospects: 
The following SEC underclassmen declared early for the 2011 draft: Renardo Sidney, Justin Hamilton Arnett Moultrie, B. J. Young, John Jenkins, Bradley Beal, Anthony Davis, Michael Kidd-Gilchrist, Marquis Teague, Terrence Jones and Doron Lamb
The following SEC underclassmen entered their name in the draft but who did not hire agents and opted to return to college: B. J. Young

Awards and honors

Player-of-the-Week

All-Americans

Starting on March 6, the 2012 NCAA Men's Basketball All-Americans were released for 2011–12 season, based upon selections by the four major syndicates. The four syndicates include the Associated Press, USBWA, NABC, and Sporting News

AP
First Team
Anthony Davis, Kentucky
Third Team
Michael Kidd-Gilchrist, Kentucky

USBWA
First Team
Anthony Davis, Kentucky
Second Team
Michael Kidd-Gilchrist, Kentucky

NABC
First Team
Anthony Davis, Kentucky
Third Team
Michael Kidd-Gilchrist, Kentucky

Sporting News
First Team
Anthony Davis, Kentucky
Second Team
Michael Kidd-Gilchrist, Kentucky

All-SEC awards and teams
Voting was by conference coaches:

All-Academic

First Team:

Second Team:

USBWA All-District team
On March 6, the U.S. Basketball Writers Association released its 2011–12 Men's All-District Teams, based on voting from its national membership. There were nine regions from coast to coast, and a player and coach of the year were selected in each. The following lists all the SEC representatives selected within their respective regions.  (Note bold represents player of the year within that district)

District IV (KY, TN, MS, AL, GA, FL)
Bradley Beal, Florida
Kenny Boynton, Florida
Anthony Davis, Kentucky
John Jenkins, Vanderbilt
Michael Kidd-Gilchrist, Kentucky
Arnett Moultrie, Mississippi State
Jeffery Taylor, Vanderbilt

References